Hammam Bab al-Ahmar meaning the Red Gate, is a hammam located in Aleppo.

Located in the Ancient City of Aleppo, near the Citadel of Aleppo, it is famous for its dome and decor from the Ottoman era.

The Hammam was closed and badly damaged due to the Syrian conflict. It was renovated in 2017 and a restaurant and café have been added to the spa.

See also
 Hammam al-Nahassin
 Hammam Yalbougha
 Ancient City of Aleppo
 Bab al-Ahmar

References

Notes
 Video of the state of destruction in 2015 of the Hammam Bab al-Ahmar

Public baths
Buildings and structures in Aleppo
Public baths in the Arab world